Harold Carpenter Lumb Stocks (21 October 1884 – 1956) was an English cathedral organist, who served in St Asaph Cathedral.

Background

Stocks was born in Essendon, Hertfordshire. He was the son of Marian Stocks and Walter Fryer Stocks, an artist. Stocks was also a composer, principally of church music, and the author of books on the training of choristers and cathedral organists.

Career

Assistant organist:
Ely Cathedral 1906–09

Organist of:
Church of St John the Baptist, Yeovil 1909–11
St Laurence Church, Ludlow 1911–17
St Asaph Cathedral 1917–56

References

English classical organists
British male organists
Cathedral organists
1884 births
1956 deaths
People from Essendon, Hertfordshire
20th-century organists
20th-century British male musicians
20th-century classical musicians
Male classical organists